Psychophysical relates to the relationship between one's internal (psychic) and external (physical) worlds.

Psychophysical may refer to:

Psychophysics, the subdiscipline of psychology dealing with the relationship between physical stimuli and their subjective correlates
Psychophysiology, the branch of psychology that is concerned with the physiological bases of psychological processes including sensory processes
 Psychophysical parallelism, the theory that the conscious and nervous processes vary concomitantly

See also 
 Psychometrics, a related field of study concerned with the theory and technique of psychological measurement